Desulfovibrio vulgaris is a species of Gram-negative sulfate-reducing bacteria in the Desulfovibrionaceae family.  Desulfovibrio vulgaris is often used as a model organism for sulfur-reducing bacteria and was the first of such bacteria to have its genome  sequenced.

Desulfovibrio vulgaris is ubiquitous in nature and has also been implicated in a variety of human bacterial infections, although it may only be an opportunistic pathogen.

References

External links
Type strain of Desulfovibrio vulgaris at BacDive -  the Bacterial Diversity Metadatabase

Desulfovibrio